EcoRI (pronounced "eco R one") is a restriction endonuclease enzyme isolated from species E. coli. It is a restriction enzyme that cleaves DNA double helices into fragments at specific sites, and is also a part of the restriction modification system. The Eco part of the enzyme's name originates from the species from which it was isolated - "E" denotes generic name which is "Escherichia" and "co" denotes species name, "coli" - while the R represents the particular strain, in this case RY13, and the I denotes that it was the first enzyme isolated from this strain.

In molecular biology it is used as a restriction enzyme. EcoRI creates 4 nucleotide sticky ends with 5' end overhangs of AATT. The nucleic acid recognition sequence where the enzyme cuts is G↓AATTC, which has a palindromic, complementary sequence of CTTAA↓G. Other restriction enzymes, depending on their cut sites, can also leave 3' overhangs or blunt ends with no overhangs.

History 
EcoRI is an example of type II restriction enzymes which now has more the 300 enzymes with more than 200 different sequence-specificities, which has transformed molecular biology and medicine.

EcoRI was isolated by PhD student Robert Yoshimori who investigated clinical E. coli isolates which contained restriction systems presented on its plasmids. The purified isolates became known as EcoRI that is used to cleave G’AATTC.

Structure

Primary structure 
EcoRI contains the PD..D/EXK motif within its active site like many restriction endonucleases.

Tertiary and quaternary structure 
The enzyme is a homodimer of a 31 kilodalton subunit consisting of one globular domain of the α/β architecture. Each subunit contains a loop which sticks out from the globular domain and wraps around the DNA when bound.

EcoRI has been cocrystallized with the sequence it normally cuts. This crystal was used to solve the structure of the complex. The solved crystal structure shows that the subunits of the enzyme homodimer interact with the DNA symmetrically. In the complex, two α-helices from each subunit come together to form a four-helix bundle. On the interacting helices are residues Glu144 and Arg145, which interact together, forming a crosstalk ring that is believed to allow the enzyme's two active sites to communicate.

Uses 

Restriction enzymes are used in a wide variety of molecular genetics techniques including cloning, DNA screening and deleting sections of DNA in vitro. Restriction enzymes, like EcoRI, that generate sticky ends of DNA are often used to cut DNA prior to ligation, as sticky ends make the ligation reaction more efficient. One example of this use is in recombinant DNA production, when joining donor and vector DNA. EcoRI can exhibit non-site-specific cutting, known as star activity, depending on the conditions present in the reaction. Conditions that can induce star activity when using EcoRI include low salt concentration, high glycerol concentration, excessive amounts of enzyme present in the reaction, high pH and contamination with certain organic solvents.

See also 

 EcoRII, another nuclease enzyme from E. coli.
 EcoRV, another nuclease enzyme from E. coli.

References

External links 
 
 

EC 3.1.21
Molecular biology
Bacterial enzymes
Restriction enzymes
Nucleases
Biotechnology